Vouzela is a municipality in the district Viseu in Portugal. The population in 2011 was 10,564, in an area of 193.69 km2.

The present mayor is Rui Ladeira, elected by the Social Democratic Party. The municipal holiday is May 14.

Parishes

Administratively, the municipality is divided into 9 civil parishes (freguesias):
 Alcofra
 Cambra e Carvalhal de Vermilhas
 Campia
 Fataunços e Figueiredo das Donas
 Fornelo do Monte
 Queirã
 São Miguel do Mato
 Ventosa
 Vouzela e Paços de Vilharigues

Notable people 
 Giles of Santarém (ca.1185 – 1265) a Portuguese-Dominican scholar.
 Simão Rodrigues (1510-1579) a Portuguese-Jesuit priest and one of the co-founders of the Society of Jesus.
 Paulo Alexandre (born 1931) a Portuguese singer.
 Luís Miguel Silva Tavares (born 1974) known as Luís Vouzela, a retired footballer with  510 club caps

References

External links
Town Hall official website
Photos from Vouzela

Towns in Portugal
Populated places in Viseu District
Municipalities of Viseu District
People from Vouzela